Henry Krawczyk (born May 29, 1946 in Poland) is an American sprint canoer who competed in the mid-1970s. At the 1976 Summer Olympics in Montreal, he was eliminated in the repechages of the K-1 500 m event.

References
 
 

1946 births
American male canoeists
Canoeists at the 1976 Summer Olympics
Living people
Olympic canoeists of the United States
Polish emigrants to the United States